Andrew Bryniarski (born February 13, 1969) is an American actor and former bodybuilder, best known for portraying Leatherface in the remake of The Texas Chain Saw Massacre and The Texas Chainsaw Massacre: The Beginning, Zangief in Street Fighter, and Steve Lattimer in The Program.

Career
Bryniarski was visiting a friend in Los Angeles, California, when he was discovered by a talent agent. The agent got him a part in Hudson Hawk. From then on, he was cast in several films that required his type, a muscular  man.

Filmography

Controversy 
The morning after news broke that Gunnar Hansen had died -- November 8, 2015 --, Bryniarski responded by saying "Boo Hoo" on Facebook. When a fan said to him, "Nice of you to insult the legend that is Gunnar Hansen," Bryniarski replied, "Could give zero fucks. suck his dead nuts" Some fans began messaging Bryniarski; he replied back with hateful comments to those fans while also insulting Hansen. Later, Bryniarski finally gave his response on the comments, saying, "I was a big supporter of his and was cool w him he was cool with me... then he started going around to promote Chainsaw 3d and he started talking shit at cons and what not...I'm not somebody who takes shit from anybody and I tell it like it is. I originally posted a fb comment that said boo hoo yest... no tag just by itself. read into it what you will. I never wished for his death or suffering from pancreatic cancer which I didn't even know he had. Lets make that a bigger issue upon his sudden death. Cancer sucks worse than haters. Yall have a nice day."

References

External links

1969 births
20th-century American male actors
21st-century American male actors
American bodybuilders
American male film actors
Living people
Male actors from Philadelphia